XHGAP-FM is a radio station on 94.7 FM in Guadalupe, Zacatecas, Mexico. The station is owned by Grupo Plata Radio and is known as Súper G.

History
XHGAP received its concession on April 26, 1991. It was owned by Manuel de Alva Peña. That same day XHGAP and sister station XHZTS-FM 91.5 signed on, this station signing on five minutes before its sister.

In February 2014, XHGAP and XHZTS moved to new facilities.

Programming
XHGAP broadcasts a Regional Mexican music format. It also has live talk and entertainment shows, mainly in the morning, the audience can call into the shows, participate in contests and games, send greetings and ask for songs.

94.7 was the radio play-by-play home of the Mineros de Zacatecas home games in the LNBP basketball league.

References

Radio stations in Zacatecas
Radio stations established in 1991